The Omega Sessions is a 5-song EP recorded by hardcore punk/reggae pioneers Bad Brains in 1980 and released in 1997. The tracks were recorded and mixed at the original Omega Recording Studios in Rockville, Maryland. The EP contains early versions of songs that eventually appeared on later releases, including a rendition of "I Against I," which would not appear on ann official Bad Brains release for another six years.

The demos were remastered in 1997 and released in November of that year by Victory Records. The EP was released on both compact disc and 10" record with limited pressings on red, gold, and green vinyl (1000 of each), as well as an even more limited 8" picture disc. All versions of the release included two previously unpublished photos by Glen E. Friedman from the time of the recording. The record’s design and handwriting were by Sean Bonner.

Track listing
 "I Against I"
 "Stay Close to Me"
 "I Luv I Jah"
 "At the Movies"
 "Attitude"

Personnel

 H.R. – vocals
 Dr. Know – guitar
 Darryl Jenifer – bass
 Earl Hudson – drums

References

Bad Brains EPs
1997 EPs
Caroline Records EPs